was a Japanese politician of the Constitutional Democratic Party of Japan and a member of the House of Councillors in the Diet of Japan. A native of Setagaya, Tokyo, and graduate of Tamagawa University, he was elected to the House of Councillors for the first time in 1999, a position he retained until his death in 2020. Hata was the Minister of Land, Infrastructure, Transport and Tourism from 4 June 2012 to 26 December 2012. He was the son of the late Prime Minister Tsutomu Hata.

Career
Hata was a member of the Itochu Foundation during his time as a student at Tamagawa University. He graduated from the university with a Bachelor of Arts in March 1993. Early in his career Hata was a secretary to his father, Prime Minister Tsutomu Hata, during the latter's tenure in the House of Representatives.

Hata served as member of the House of Councillors in the Diet beginning with his election in 1999. He was affiliated with the Democratic Party of Japan (DPJ), the Democratic Party for the People (DPP) after the merger of the Democratic Party and Kibō no Tō, and finally Constitutional Democratic Party of Japan (CDP) after the DPP's dissolution. On 4 June 2012 Hata was appointed to be the Minister of Land, Infrastructure, Transport and Tourism by Prime Minister Yoshihiko Noda. Following the loss of the Democratic Party of Japan to the Liberal Democratic Party in the 2012 Japanese general election, Noda and his Cabinet, including Hata, were succeeded by Shinzo Abe and his Cabinet on 26 December 2012. In all, he served as a legislator for five terms and was the initial Secretary-General of the Upper House caucus of the CDP at the time of his death in December 2020.

Visits to Yasukuni shrine
On 15 August 2012, Hata, along with National Safety Commissioner Jin Matsubara became the first cabinet ministers of the DPJ to openly visit the controversial Yasukuni Shrine since the party came to power in 2009. They made their visits to commemorate the 67th anniversary of the end of World War II despite requests from South Korea to refrain from doing so, and despite Prime Minister Yoshihiko Noda requesting his cabinet not to do so.

Political positions
Generally, Hata was part of Japan's center-left political parties. He was a member of the DPJ and later, the CDP, both of which are center-left parties. He held positions consistent with the platform of those parties. He was opposed to the revision of Article 9 of the Japanese Constitution that prohibits Japan from going to war. After the Fukushima Daiichi nuclear disaster, he became critical of Japan's use of nuclear power, stating that the country should aim to get rid of its plants eventually and that the country should not support nuclear projects in other countries. Hata was a supporter of agricultural protectionism in regards to fair trade agreements such as the Trans-Pacific Partnership.

Death
Yuichiro Hata died from COVID-19 in Tokyo on 27 December 2020, at age 53, during the COVID-19 pandemic in Japan while being transported to the University of Tokyo Hospital. He is the first Japanese legislator to die of the disease.

See also
Noda Cabinet

References

External links
  in Japanese.

1967 births
People from Setagaya
2020 deaths
Politicians from Tokyo
Members of the House of Councillors (Japan)
Children of prime ministers of Japan
Democratic Party of Japan politicians
Ministers of Land, Infrastructure, Transport and Tourism of Japan
Transport ministers of Japan
Deaths from the COVID-19 pandemic in Japan